VAH-21, nicknamed the Roadrunners, was a short-lived Heavy Attack Squadron of the U.S. Navy, based at Naval Station Sangley Point, Philippines. The squadron flew the specialized AP-2H version of the Lockheed P-2 Neptune aircraft, of which four examples were converted from standard SP-2H airframes.

Operations
The squadron was established on 1 September 1968, as the first squadron in the Navy with a night interdiction mission using new electronic surveillance equipment. Its mission was to interdict logistics moving over land or sea. A detachment of VAH-21 was immediately established at a Navy facility associated with Cam Ranh Air Base, South Vietnam. The detachment had been a Naval Air Test Center Project TRIM Detachment (TRIM: Trails Roads Interdiction Multi-sensor) prior to becoming a VAH-21 detachment. VAH-21 was disestablished on 16 June 1969.

See also
 History of the United States Navy
 List of inactive United States Navy aircraft squadrons

References

Heavy attack squadrons of the United States Navy
Wikipedia articles incorporating text from the Dictionary of American Naval Aviation Squadrons